Ammotrecha is a genus of ammotrechid camel spiders, first described by Nathan Banks in 1900.

Species 
, the World Solifugae Catalog accepts the following ten species:

 Ammotrecha araucana Mello-Leitão, 1942 — Chile
 Ammotrecha chiapasi Muma, 1986 — Mexico
 Ammotrecha cobinensis Muma, 1951 — Mexico, US (California)
 Ammotrecha enriquei Armas & Teruel, 2005 — Cuba
 Ammotrecha friedlaenderi Roewer, 1954 — Brazil
 Ammotrecha itzaana Muma, 1986 — Mexico
 Ammotrecha limbata (Lucas, 1835) — El Salvador, Guatemala, Mexico
 Ammotrecha nigrescens Roewer, 1934 — Costa Rica, Guatemala
 Ammotrecha picta Pocock, 1902 — Guatemala
 Ammotrecha stollii (Pocock, 1895) — Costa Rica, El Salvador, Grenada, Guatemala, Mexico, Nicaragua, US (Louisiana, Texas)

References 

Arachnid genera
Solifugae